Lampo may refer to:
 Italian ship Lampo, the name of several Italian ships
 Lampo-class destroyer, a class of Italian warship
 Lampo (dog) (1950–1961), an Italian mixed-breed dog famous for his rail journeys
 Hubert Lampo (1920–2006), Flemish writer
 Léon Lampo (1923–1985), Belgian basketball player
 Pope Leo XI, also known as Papa Lampo
 Lampo, a character in 44 Cats

See also
Lampus